USS Lilian or USS Lillian may refer to the following United States Navy ships:

 , a steamer in commission from 1864 to 1865
 , a patrol boat in commission in 1917

United States Navy ship names